Wenjin Temple, is a buddhist temple located in Liuyang city, Hunan province, in the People's Republic of China. It includes the shanmen, Mahavira Hall, Four Heavenly Kings Hall, Hall of Saintly Emperor Guan, Meditation Room, Dining Room, etc.

History
In 827, in the second year of the age of Dahe of Emperor Wenzong, monk Zongzhi built this temple.

After the founding of Communist States, the temple stopped religious activities.

In 1966, during the Cultural Revolution, the transport team lived here.

In 1987, Chengxi School extended school buildings, the temple was removed.

In 1989, Liu Puquan, the president of Liuyang Buddhism Association rebuilt the temple.

Gallery

References

External links

Buildings and structures in Liuyang
Buddhist temples in Hunan
Tourist attractions in Changsha
1989 establishments in China
Religious buildings and structures completed in 1989
20th-century Buddhist temples